The 2011–2012 Jordanian Pro League (known as the Al-Manaseer Jordanian Pro League, named after Ziad AL-Manaseer Companies Group for sponsorship reasons) was the 60th season of the top-flight football in Jordan and started in August 2011 to May 2012
Al-Faisaly won its 32nd title after winning the league play-off match against Al-Ramtha 3–0. Kfarsoum and Al-Jalil were relegated to the second level.

Teams
, Al-Wehdat was the defending champions.
Al-Hussein (Irbid) and Al-Ahli were relegated to the second level of Jordan football. Al Ahli had withdrawn from the league prior to finishing the campaign due to the Arab Spring. Al-Hussein (Irbid) on the other hand lost in the end of season relegation playoff against Kfarsoum after both teams finished the season level on points.
Promoted from the second level are Al-Jalil and That Ras.

Map

League standings

Fixtures and results

Championship playoff
Because the top two teams finished with the same number of points, a championship playoff was played to determine the champions of Jordan for 2011–2012 season.

Jordanian Pro League seasons
2011–12 in Asian association football leagues
1